The description Paris of the West or in some cases Paris of America has been applied to a number of locations, including:

 Buenos Aires, Argentina
 Cincinnati, Ohio, United States
 Denver, Colorado, United States
 Detroit, Michigan, United States
 Merida, Yucatán, Mexico
 Montreal, Québec, Canada
 San Francisco, California, United States

See also
 Paris of the East
 Paris of the North
 Paris of the South
 Paris of the plains
 Paris of the Prairies
 Little Paris (disambiguation)

References

Paris of the West